All The Way... and Then Some! is a studio album by Sammy Davis Jr., released in 1958.

Track listing
 "All the Way" (Jimmy Van Heusen, Sammy Cahn) - 2:59
 "Look to Your Heart" (Van Heusen, Cahn) - 3:24
 "Wonder Why" (Nicholas Brodzsky, Cahn) - 2:46
 "They Can't Take That Away from Me" (Ira Gershwin, George Gershwin) - 2:03
 "All the Things You Are" (Jerome Kern, Oscar Hammerstein II) - 3:03
 "In the Still of the Night" (Cole Porter) - 3:27
 "On a Slow Boat to China" (Frank Loesser) - 2:40
 "We'll Meet Again" (Ross Parker, Hughie Charles) - 2:50
 "When I Fall in Love" (Victor Young, Edward Heyman) - 3:29
 "Stay as Sweet as You Are" (Mack Gordon, Harry Revel) - 3:53
 "Night and Day" (Porter) - 2:28
 "I Concentrate on You" (Porter) - 2:48

Personnel
Sammy Davis Jr. - vocals
Morty Stevens - conductor (tracks 2, 3, 4, 9, 12)
Jack Pleis - conductor (track 1)
Dick Stabile - conductor (tracks 5, 8)
Russell Garcia - conductor (tracks 6, 7)
Sonny Burke - conductor (tracks 10, 11)

References

Decca Records albums
Sammy Davis Jr. albums
1958 albums
Albums conducted by Russell Garcia (composer)